Shlomo Dov Pinchas Lazar (born May 19, 1964), better known as Berel Lazar, is an Orthodox, Chabad-Lubavitch Hasidic rabbi. He began his service in Russia in 1990. Known for his friendship with Vladimir Putin, since 2000, he has been a Chief Rabbi of Russia (one of two claimants to the title), and chairman of the Federation of Jewish Communities of Russia and Federation of Jewish Communities of the CIS. In September 2005 Lazar became a member of the Public Chamber of Russia. Because of his connections to Russian President Vladimir Putin he is sometimes called "Putin's rabbi."

Biography 

A native of Milan, Italy, Lazar was born in 1964 to parents who were among the first emissaries of Rabbi Menachem Mendel Schneerson. Until the age of 15, he studied in Milan’s Merkaz Jewish Day School. Afterwards, he went on to study in New York and pursued a Bachelor of Arts degree in religious studies at the Rabbinical College of America in Morristown, New Jersey. At the age of 23, he was ordained at the Central Lubavitch Yeshiva in New York City.

Since 1990 Lazar has been rabbi of the synagogue in Maryina roshcha District of Moscow. In 1992 Lazar became acquainted with Israeli diamantaire Lev Leviev, who introduced him to Russian businessmen Boris Berezovsky and Roman Abramovich. The latter became the major benefactor of the synagogue in Maryina roshcha.

In 1992, Lazar was appointed chairman of the Rabbinical Alliance of the Commonwealth of Independent States (CIS).

In early 1990s Lazar participated in activity of Congress of the Jewish Religious Organizations and Associations in Russia (CJROAR), was an active participant of founding congress of Russian Jewish Congress in 1996 and even was a member of RJC Presidium. In 1997 he helped establish the Federation of Jewish Communities of the CIS representing Chabad communities in 15 countries of the former Soviet Union.

At the first congress of Federation of Jewish Communities of Russia (FJCR) opened on November 15, 1999 he was elected chief Rabbi of FJCR. According to many analytics, FJCR structure was created as counterbalance to the Russian Jewish Congress (headed by Vladimir Gusinsky) and CJROAR (chief Rabbi — Adolf Shayevich). In the same month Lazar had his first meeting with Vladimir Putin. On May 29, 2000 Berel Lazar became a citizen of Russia, while retaining his U.S. citizenship.

On June 13, 2000 at the "all-Jews congress" (of 87 communities at the place, 70 represented FJCR, 4 — CJROAR, the rest — Federation of Jewish Organizations and Communities of Russia (Va’ad)) 25 of 26 Rabbis elected Lazar Chief Rabbi of Russia. On September 18, 2000, in the presence of President of Russia Vladimir Putin, the Moscow Jewish Community Center was opened in Maryina Roshcha District, where on December 21, 2000 Vladimir Putin and Moscow mayor Yury Luzhkov lit Hanukkah candles.

In 2000, Lazar was appointed to Russia's Council for Coordination of Religious Associations. In 2002, Lazar was elected the Chairman of the Rabbinical Council of the World Congress of Russian Jewry. On January 23, 2001 he participated in the official meeting with President of Israel Moshe Katsav in the Kremlin.

On March 20, 2001 under instruction of the President Vladimir Putin, Lazar was included in the Presidential Council for Interaction with Religious Organizations and Unions; simultaneously Shayevich was excluded from the Council. According to both the Russian government and Federation of Jewish Communities, he is the Chief Rabbi of Russia.

Lazar spoke out against the 2022 Russian invasion of Ukraine, called Russia to withdraw and for an end to the war, and offered to mediate.

Views

Interfaith dialogue 
Lazar is an advocate of interfaith dialogue and sits on the Board of World Religious Leaders for The Elijah Interfaith Institute.

Awards 
In 2004, Russian President Vladimir Putin signed an edict to honor him with the Order of Friendship. This award was presented for the contribution made by Lazar to developing culture and strengthening friendship between nations within Russia.
In December 2004, he was honored with a national public award, the 'Minin and Pozharsky' Order "for his great personal contribution to strengthening the moral and cultural fabric of the Russian State and for reviving spiritual life and religious freedom in the country".
In June 2005, he was awarded the Medal "60 Years of the Victory in the Great Patriotic War 1941-1945". He received the medal during the 19th session of the Russian 'Pobeda' (Victory) Organizational Committee.
In September 2005, he received the 'Peter the Great' First Class Order. The diploma attached to the Order explains that the Chief Rabbi was honored with this award "considering his activities in advancing inter-ethnic and inter-religious relations, and his great contribution to the spiritual rebirth of Russia’s Jewish community and to strengthening Russian state".

At the sixtieth anniversary commemoration of the liberation of Auschwitz at the concentration camp, Putin gave a speech. His speech was followed by Lazar awarding Putin the so-called Salvation Medal as a symbol of "the Jewish people's gratitude" to Russia for liberating the camp.

Gallery

References

External links 
 Chief Rabbinate of Russia
 Page One article from The Wall Street Journal, May 8, 2007
 Biography in Lentapedia (in Russian)
 Official Facebook page

1964 births
20th-century Italian rabbis
21st-century rabbis
Chabad-Lubavitch rabbis
Chief rabbis of Russia
Hasidic rabbis in Europe
Italian Orthodox rabbis
Italian emigrants to Russia
Living people
Members of the Civic Chamber of the Russian Federation
Clergy from Milan
Russian Hasidic rabbis
Chabad-Lubavitch emissaries
Italian Ashkenazi Jews
Rabbis from Moscow
Russian activists against the 2022 Russian invasion of Ukraine